The Grassroots Democratic Party (GDP; , abbr. ) is an independent political party based in Phnom Penh, Cambodia. It is headed by its chairman Yang Saing Koma, Yeng Virak as party president and Sam Inn as secretary-general. The party is one of the candidates in the 2018 Cambodian parliamentary election of the National Assembly.

Background
The Grassroots Democratic Party (GDP), ( was founded on 2 August 2015 by former non-government organization (NGO) leaders, intellectuals and community leaders from more than 10 communes of Cambodia. The key founding members of GDP are Dr. Kem Ley (assassinated on 10 July 2016), Dr. Yang Saing Koma, Mr. Yeng Virak and Dr. Sam Inn.

Party officers
Chairman - Yang Saing Koma

President - Yeng Virak

Vice President - Sam Sundeoum

Secretary General - Sam Inn

Deputy Secretary General - Loek Sothea

Party platform
The original ideas behind the founding of the GDP were as follows:
 The extreme rivalry between the two main political parties, Cambodian People's Party (CPP) and the former Cambodia National Rescue Party (CNRP), creating a negative impact on the political atmosphere and the democratization process in Cambodia. The existing political leaders tended to focus more on attacking and blaming each other rather than on developing appropriate policies to resolve social and economic national issues.
 The lack of a culture and environment that would enable Cambodian citizens, particularly young people, women and other responsible citizens, to participate actively in the political process without fear and discrimination. There is no political party with an intra party mechanism that allows free and active participation of members. Generally, all political parties tended to adopt a top down approach.

Brief profile of the party
The official logo of the party is triangular representing “bottom-up democracy.” The logo has four colors:  green, blue, red and white. The official color of the party is green, representing grassroots democracy and sustainable development.
The core values of GDP are:   
Solidarity
Justice
Non-violence
Freedom
Integrity
Republicanism
The vision of the party is “All Cambodian citizens living in dignity and the country has full national sovereignty.”
The mission of the party is “To nurture good leaders and building democratic foundation for the whole nation.”
The party has adopted the following internal principles:
Open and voluntary 
Member democracy
Decentralization
Facilitating and capacity building roles of leaders
Financial autonomy
Enabling active participation of women and youth

The national structure of the GDP:
 General Assembly (GA), consisting of up to 300 delegates 
Board of Governance, with chairman elected by the General Assembly (GA)
Executive Committee (EC), with the president elected by the GA.  The president of the EC is also the official president of the GDP
Conflict Resolution and Discipline Committee, with the chairperson elected by the GA
The current national leaders of the GDP are:
Mr. Yeng Virak – party co-founder and party president
Dr. Yang Saing Koma – party co-founder and chairman of the governance board 
Mrs. Prok Vanny – party co-founder and chairwoman  of the conflict resolution and discipline committee
Dr. Sam Inn –  party co-founder and general secretary (elected by the Board of Governance)win

The party garnered 70,291 or 1.11% of the popularity votes cast on July 29, 2018 parliamentary election but short of winning a single seat in the National Assembly.

Local election 2017
The GDP participated in the local elections held on 3 June 2017 by competing in 27 communes, winning five seats in 3 communes. The average results in 27 communes indicated that GDP ranked third after the two main rivals (CPP and CNRP), but in Pate commune GDP ranked second, receiving the same number of seats as CPP (CPP - 2, GDP - 2, CNRP - 1). 
Following the dissolution of CNRP, the GDP did not accept any re-allocation of CNRP seats.

National Election 2018
The GDP participated in the national election held on 29 July 2018 and competed in all 25 constituencies. The party presented itself as the new alternative and the new hope for all Cambodians.
The GDP's political platform consisting of 125 key policies which are presented in the “Green Book.” The 125 policies are classified in national reconciliation and unity policies, national building policies, national protection and security policies and international cooperation policies. As part of the national reconciliation and unity, the GDP aims to create a solidarity government by inviting all political parties with National Assembly (NA) seats to form super nation building councils by inviting all former top national political leaders to be members.
For the election campaign among the general population, the GDP has summarized the key nation building policies in a one-page format which is known as Sor 5 policies, the Khmer acronym for five sectors, including:  economy and jobs, health, education and youth, social welfare and public services and democratic governance. Among the 125 policies, 15 policies have been selected for the general campaign:
Economy and jobs
5,000 agriculture development facilitators will work with farmers throughout Cambodia to address issues including:  of lacking water, capital, market and appropriate technologies
Registered Small Medium Enterprises (SMEs) will qualify for five years of tax exemption. Provision of subsidized loans of 6 percent per year will be available to agro and food processing entrepreneurs and exporters in developing markets for Cambodian products.
Young people wanting to start their own business will receive seed capital of US$1,250 as well as a long-term subsidized loan
Health care
A universal health care plan will be developed at 500 riel per citizen per month (18 to 65 years old)
Develop health centers and hospitals with high professional standards. All health officials will receive a minimum salary of US$500 per month.
Ensure an effective implementation of food safety laws and regulations
Education and youth
Every village will have access to a quality kindergarten and qualified teachers
Every student will be eligible to obtain a study loan up to US$1,250 per year
Schools and universities will be required to have high professional standards, and all teachers will receive minimum salary of US$500 per month
Social protection and welfare
Every woman will get US$125 for every birth delivery
Citizens over age 65 will get a US$37.50 per month pension
Every worker will be eligible to receive unemployment benefits up to 50 percent of salary for five months
Public services and democratic governance
All Members of Parliament are accountable to citizens, not to government 
All government officials are accountable to citizens and Members of Parliament (Good Government Officials)
Active citizen participation will be encouraged to ensure accountable government and parliament (Good Citizens).
It is important to note that the party will meet again in June 2018 to decide the next step in the process of participation in the election, including the election of the top candidate or prime minister (PM) candidate.
The GDP recognizes that one of the factors for free and fair elections is to ensure that there is a sufficient number of election observers at all polling stations, including both independent observers (national and international observers), as well as observers recruited directly by the GDP.

The party garnered 70,291 or 1.11% of the popular votes on July 29, 2018 parliamentary election but short of winning a seat in the National Assembly of Cambodia.

Recent electoral history

References

2015 establishments in Cambodia
Cambodian democracy movements
Liberal parties in Cambodia
Nationalist parties in Cambodia
Political parties established in 2015
Political parties in Cambodia
Populist parties
Republican parties in Cambodia
Social democratic parties in Cambodia
Social liberal parties